Liangkang Kangri (also known as Gangkhar Puensum North and Liankang Kangri) is a mountain peak in the Himalayas on the border between Bhutan and China, as well as at the southeastern end of territory claimed by both countries. To the south, a ridge leads to the  Gangkhar Puensum  to the south-southeast. The Liangkanggletscher on the northwest flank and the Namsanggletscher on the eastern flank of Liangkang Kangri form the headwaters of the Lhobrak Chhu, a source river of Kuri Chhu. The glacier on the southwest flank belongs to the catchment area of Angde Chhu.

The first ascent of Liankang Kangri was by a 5-member party led by the Japanese mountaineer Kiyohiko Suzuki on 5 May 1999. According to them, Liankang Kangri was the second highest unclimbed mountain in the world, after Gangkhar Puensum. Team member Tamotsu Nakamura commented to the BBC after the party's success,  “As I cannot disclose an inside story behind the sudden cancellation, I write only the reason why the permit was withdrawn because of a political issue with [the] Bhutan government. (...) I regret that Liangkang Kangri is not an outstanding summit."

References 

Mountains of Bhutan
Mountains of Tibet
Bhutan–China border
International mountains of Asia
Seven-thousanders of the Himalayas